Trudie Chalder is Professor of Cognitive Behavioural Psychotherapy at the Institute of Psychiatry in King's College London. Prof Chalder was president of the British Association for Behavioural and Cognitive Psychotherapies (BABCP) (2012-2014) and Director of the South London and Maudsley NHS Foundation Trust’s Persistent Physical Symptoms Service.

Bibliography

Books

Selected articles
Chalder, Trudie, G. Berelowitz, Teresa Pawlikowska, Louise Watts, S. Wessely, D. Wright, and E. P. Wallace. "Development of a fatigue scale." Journal of Psychosomatic Research 37, no. 2 (1993): 147–153. 
Deale, Alicia, Trudie Chalder, Isaac Marks, and Simon Wessely. "Cognitive behavior therapy for chronic fatigue syndrome: a randomized controlled trial." American Journal of Psychiatry 154, no. 3 (1997): 408–414. pdf
Wessely, Simon, Trudie Chalder, Steven Hirsch, Paul Wallace, and David Wright. "The prevalence and morbidity of chronic fatigue and chronic fatigue syndrome: a prospective primary care study." American Journal of Public Health 87, no. 9 (1997): 1449–1455. pdf

References

Year of birth missing (living people)
Living people
Academics of King's College London
British women academics
British women psychologists
Place of birth missing (living people)